Thitipoom Techaapaikhun (also known as New or Newwiee, born 30 January 1993) is a Thai actor and host. He is known for his main roles as Apo in GMMTV's Water Boyy: The Series (2017), and Kao in Kiss: The Series (2016), Kiss Me Again (2018), Our Skyy (2018), and Dark Blue Kiss (2019).

Early life and education 
Thitipoom was born in Bangkok, Thailand. He later moved to Hat Yai, Songkhla Province where he completed his secondary education at Hat Yai Witthayalai School. He graduated with a bachelor's degree in electrical engineering from the Faculty of Engineering and a master's degree in business administration from the Faculty of Commerce and Accountancy, both at Chulalongkorn University.

Career 
Thitipoom started as a model and became one of the new hosts of Bang Channel's Five Live Fresh in 2014. He made his acting debut in Room Alone 401-410, a 2014 television series by GMMTV. He later got the support role of Kao alongside Tawan Vihokratana for Kiss: The Series and Kiss Me Again and as Em in SOTUS: The Series.

In 2017, he got the main role of Apo in Water Boyy: The Series, a TV remake of a film with the same name and reprised his role as Em in SOTUS S: The Series.

In 2019, he reprised his role as Kao, this time as a main role, in the third installment of Kiss The Series titled Dark Blue Kiss, alongside Tawan.

He also starred in Classic Again, a Thai remake of the 2003 South Korean romantic drama The Classic and is working on I Need Romance 3.

Filmography

Film

Television

Music video appearances

Discography

Awards and nominations

References

External links 

 
 
 

1993 births
Living people
Thitipoom Techaapaikhun
Thitipoom Techaapaikhun
Thitipoom Techaapaikhun
Thitipoom Techaapaikhun
Thitipoom Techaapaikhun